Harts Ground or Harts Grounds is a former parish in Holland Fen with Brothertoft parish, and the Borough of Boston, Lincolnshire, England.

Harts Ground was formerly an extra-parochial area, prone to flooding prior to the drainage of Holland Fen in 1767. It was a civil parish, from 1858 to 1935 when it was reduced to enlarge Dogdyke. It was, and remains today, an area of isolated farms.

Harts Grounds Farmhouse dated to the late 18th century and was built in rendered brick with a pantile roof. It was a Grade II listed building but was de-listed in May 2018 as it was no longer in existence

References

External links

Hamlets in Lincolnshire
Former civil parishes in Lincolnshire
1858 establishments in England
Borough of Boston